Chapman Aerodrome  is a registered aerodrome located on the shores of the Blackstone River in the Yukon, Canada.

References

External links
Page about this airport on COPA's Places to Fly airport directory

Registered aerodromes in Yukon